Alexander Murray of Elibank (9 December 1712 – 27 February 1778) was the fourth son of Alexander Murray, 4th Lord Elibank and brother of Patrick Murray, 5th Lord Elibank. Horace Walpole said that Murray and his brother were "both such active Jacobites, that if the Pretender had succeeded, they could have produced many witnesses to testify their zeal for him; both so cautious, that no witnesses of actual treason could be produced by the government against them".

Early life
Murray took a  commission in the 26th (Cameronian) Regiment of Foot on 11 August 1737, eventually becoming a lieutenant. A marriage of convenience gave him an annual income of £3,000. This enabled him to lend to Charles Edward Stuart hundreds of pounds at high interest at a time when Charles was short of money. This also led him into Charles' inner circle.

He took no part in the Jacobite rising of 1745.

In January 1751 during a by-election to Parliament, Murray supported the opposition Whig candidate Sir George Vandeput, 2nd Baronet. It was claimed that Murray encouraged mob violence by shouting: "Will no one have courage enough to knock the dog down?" In February Murray was summoned before the House of Commons and sent to Newgate Prison. When he was in the House of Commons and ordered to kneel down to receive his sentence, Murray refused, saying: "Sir, I beg to be excused; I never kneel but to God". He was returned to Newgate for two months for contempt, and he was refused release when brought before the House again. He tried to obtain a writ of Habeas corpus but was released on 25 June as Parliament was prorogued. Upon release he was driven to his brother's house in Henrietta Street near Covent Garden, being cheered by a numerous crowd carrying a banner with the words "Murray and Liberty" inscribed.

Elibank Plot
In 1751-1752 Murray became involved in a Jacobite plot that came to bear his name. The plan was to kidnap King George II and other members of the Royal Family on 10 November 1752 and place them on a boat in the Thames that would sail to France. Detailed analysis of the sentry system at St James's Palace was taken down and two or three hundred men were chosen to congregate at Westminster, though to avoid suspicion they would lodge at separate properties. On the night that the King would be abducted, they would assemble at pre-planned locations, with St James's being seized, the Tower of London's gates opened, the guards overwhelmed and the Royal Family smuggled to France. Murray suggested that the Royal Family be murdered, perhaps by poison. Charles rejected this, however.

The plot foundered on its participants' pessimism and Murray announced a postponement of the operation, travelling to Paris to inform Charles.

Later life
Murray remained in exile for the next twenty years. In 1759 James Francis Edward Stuart created him Earl of Westminster. In April 1771 he was allowed to return to Britain. He died at Taplow, Buckinghamshire.

Notes

References
Hugh Douglas, ‘Murray,  Alexander, of Elibank, Jacobite earl of Westminster  (1712–1778)’, Oxford Dictionary of National Biography, Oxford University Press,  2004, accessed 14 June 2013.
Frank McLynn, Charles Edward Stuart. A Tragedy in Many Acts (London: Routledge, 1988).
Horace Walpole, Memoirs of King George II. I: January 1751–March 1754 (Yale University Press, 1985).

Further reading
Charles Petrie, ‘The Elibank plot, 1752–53’, Transactions of the Royal Historical Society, 4th series, 14 (1931), pp. 175–96

1712 births
1778 deaths
Scottish soldiers
Cameronians soldiers
Scottish Jacobites
Westminster, Alexander Murray, 1st Earl of
Younger sons of barons